The 2016 European Le Mans Series was the thirteenth season of the Automobile Club de l'Ouest's (ACO) European Le Mans Series. The six-event season began at Silverstone Circuit, in conjunction with the FIA World Endurance Championship, on 16 April and finished at Autódromo do Estoril on 23 October.

Regulations
The GTC class for GT3 was dropped due to a lack of entries during 2015 and the creation of the GT3 Le Mans Cup.

Calendar
The provisional 2016 calendar was announced at 5 September 2015. The calendar comprises six events, featuring the same five circuits that hosted events in 2015 and for the first time since 2011 it will include event at Spa. For the fourth consecutive season, Silverstone hosted the opening rounds of both the European Le Mans Series and the FIA World Endurance Championship. Meanwhile, the other rounds were collaboration with World Series by Renault.

Entry list
The entry list was announced on 5 February 2016.

LMP2

LMP3

GTE

Innovative car

Results and standings

Race results
Bold indicates overall winner.

To be classified a car will have to cross  the  finish  line  on  the  race  track  when the  chequered  flag  is  shown,  except  in  a  case  of force majeure at the Stewards’ discretion and have  covered  at  least  70% (the  official  number  of  laps  will  be  rounded down to the nearest whole number) of the  distance  covered  by  the  car  classified  in  first  place  in  the overall classification.

Teams Championships
Points are awarded according to the following structure:

LMP2 Teams Championship

LMP3 Teams Championship

GTE Teams Championship

Drivers Championships
Points are awarded according to the following structure:

LMP2 Drivers Championship

LMP3 Drivers Championship

GTE Drivers Championship

References

External links
 

European Le Mans Series seasons
European Le Mans Series
Le Mans Series